Ségalin is a red French wine grape variety that is a crossing of Jurançon noir and Portugais. As a varietal, Ségalin has the potential to produce well structured wines.

Ségalin has no synonyms.

References

Red wine grape varieties